Vernon is the most populous town in Tolland County, Connecticut, United States. The population was 30,215 at the 2020 census. Vernon  contains the smaller villages of  Talcottville and Dobsonville. Vernon contains the former City of Rockville.

History
Vernon was incorporated in October 1808, from Bolton. Vernon was named after George Washington's Mount Vernon estate. Vernon contains the former city of Rockville, incorporated in January 1889 and consolidated in January 1965.

Geography

Demographics

At the 2000 census, there were 28,063 people, 12,269 households and 7,275 families living in the town. The racial makeup of the town was 89.95% White, 3.99% African American, 0.24% Native American, 2.65% Asian, 0.04% Pacific Islander, 1.22% from other races, and 1.91% from two or more races. Hispanic or Latino of any race were 3.58% of the population.

There were 12,269 households, out of which 26.5% had children under the age of 18 living with them, 45.3% were married couples living together, 10.5% had a female householder with no husband present, and 40.7% were non-families. 33.0% of all households were made up of individuals, and 10.6% had someone living alone who was 65 years of age or older. The average household size was 2.26 and the average family size was 2.90.

22.1% of the population was under the age of 18, 7.7% from 18 to 24, 32.4% from 25 to 44, 23.9% from 45 to 64, and 13.9% who were 65 years of age or older. The median age was 38 years. For every 100 females there were 91.6 males. For every 100 females age 18 and over, there were 89.1 males.

The median income for a household in the town was $47,816, and the median income for a family was $59,599. Males had a median income of $43,620 versus $31,515 for females. The per capita income for the town was $25,150. About 4.1% of families and 5.9% of the population were below the poverty line, including 7.9% of those under age 18 and 6.1% of those age 65 or over.

City of Rockville 
Most of Rockville has been designated as part of the Rockville Historic District. The district is roughly bounded by Shenipsit Street, Davis Avenue, West Street and South Street was added in 1984 to the National Register of Historic Places. The district includes 842 buildings and one other structure. It includes examples of Greek Revival, Late Victorian, and Classical Revival architecture. The historic district includes 842 buildings and one other structure over 550 acres (2.2 km2). The Population of this part of Vernon is 7,474.

Buildings of architectural or historic interest in Rockville include:

 St. Bernard Church
 Memorial Building housing the New England Civil War Museum and the Grand Army of the Republic Hall as well as the town offices for Vernon.
 Old Rockville High School and East School
 Hockanum Mill
 Saxony Mill
 Florence Mill
 The Tower on Fox Hill

Education

Elementary schools
 Lake Street School
 Maple Street School
 Northeast School
 Center Road School
 Skinner Road School

Middle and secondary schools
 Vernon Center Middle School

Secondary schools 
 Rockville High School

Fire Protection 
Fire Protection for the Town of Vernon is provided by the Town of Vernon Fire Department, formed in 1980 when the Vernon Fire District and the Rockville Fire Department merged. The Town of Vernon Fire Department (TVFD) is an all volunteer fire department that operates out of 5 Fire Stations as well as a Public Safety Building which houses EMS operations, Department Administration, the Office of Emergency and Risk Management, as well as the town's Emergency Operations Center.

The Department operates 5 engine companies, 1 heavy rescue, 1 squad (engine rescue) and 2 tower ladders. The TVFD is dispatched by Tolland County Mutual Fire Service (Station TN).

Points of interest 
 Arts Center East
 Belding Wildlife Property
 Gene Pitney Exhibit in Town Hall
 New England Civil War Museum
 Rails to Trails
 Rockville Community Alliance
 Rockville Farmers Market
 Talcottville Historic District
 Talcottville Ravine
 Valley Falls Park
 Vernon Historical Society
 Victorian homes
 Henry Park/Fox Hill Tower

Notable people

 Jahine Arnold (born 1973), former NFL wide receiver
 Lucille Barkley, film actress in the 1940s and 1950s, died in Vernon
 Joe Courtney, current U.S. congressman from Connecticut's 2nd congressional district
 Stephen Farrell (1863–1933), world champion sprinter and track coach
 George L. Graziadio, Jr., business and property developer born in Vernon
 Marie Herbst, politician and former mayor of Vernon
 Ross A. Hull, radio engineer, lived and died in Vernon
 Martin Kellogg, former president of the University of California, was born in Vernon
 Morgan Lewis (1906–1968), songwriter and Broadway theatre composer
 Dwight Loomis (1821–1903), U.S. Representative
 Dwight Marcy, politician and attorney in Vernon
 Kenneth North (1930–2010), U.S. Air Force brigadier general
 Bob Pease (1940–2011), analog integrated circuit design expert and technical author
 Jim Penders, head coach of the Connecticut Huskies baseball team, was born in Vernon
 M. William Phelps, investigative journalist and crime writer, lives in Vernon
 Gene Pitney (1941–2006), internationally known singer/songwriter, member of Rock & Roll Hall of Fame, born in Hartford, raised in Rockville
 Charles Ethan Porter (–1923), an African-American still-life painter, lived in the Rockville neighborhood as a child
 Bill Romanowski, was born in Vernon; he is a former professional American football player and four-time Super Bowl champion
 Christian Sharps, inventor of the Sharps rifle, spent the final years of his life farming in Vernon
 Eliza Talcott, American missionary to Japan and co-founder of Kobe College
 Katie Taylor, Irish boxer and former footballer
 Teephlow, West African poet and rapper from Ghana currently resides in Vernon
 Mark Warner, former Governor of Virginia and current U.S. Senator, was raised in Vernon

See also

References

External links
 Vernon official website
 Vernon-Rockville community information

 
Towns in Connecticut
Towns in Tolland County, Connecticut
Greater Hartford